Archduke Rainer of Austria may refer to:

 Archduke Rainer Joseph of Austria (1783–1853), eighth son of Emperor Leopold II
 Archduke Rainer Ferdinand of Austria (1827–1913), fourth son of Archduke Rainer (1783-1853)
 Archduke Rainer of Austria (1895–1930) (1895–1930), eldest son of Archduke Leopold Salvator